Qanat Bid (also Romanized as Qanāt Bīd; also known as Kahn-e Bīd) is a village in Rabor Rural District, in the Central District of Rabor County, Kerman Province, Iran. At the 2006 census, its population was 40, in 12 families.

References 

Populated places in Rabor County